Extra is a Mexican convenience store chain owned by Grupo Modelo, which started operations in 1993. In 2007 the chain closed 650 stores and in 2009 started another restructuring plan. It competes fiercely with OXXO from Femsa, 7-Eleven from Casa Chapa, SuperCity from Soriana and Circle K from Alimentation Couche-Tard. The point of sale is provided by IBM. In 2014, Couche-Tard sold its Extra stores to Grupo Modelo, a brewery owned by AB InBev.

Gallery

References 

Convenience stores
Retail companies of Mexico
Alimentation Couche-Tard
Retail companies established in 1993